Edward Jones Pearson (October 4, 1863 - December 7, 1928) was president of the New York, New Haven and Hartford Railroad.

Biography
He was born on October 4, 1863 in Rockville, Indiana.

Graduated from Engineering Department of Cornell University.

Entered railway service: 1880 as rodman Missouri Pacific, since which he has been consecutively to 1883, in Engineering Department Missouri–Kansas–Texas Railroad and Atlantic and Pacific Railroad; 1883 to 1885, assistant engineer, Northern Pacific; 1885 to April, 1890, supervisor, Bridges, Buildings and Water Supply, Minnesota and St. Paul divisions; April, 1890, to May, 1892, division engineer, Eastern Division of same road; May, 1892, to May, 1894, principal assistant engineer at Chicago in charge of construction of Chicago Terminal Lines and of work on the Wisconsin Central Lines being operated by the Northern Pacific; May, 1894, to August, 1895, superintendent, Yellowstone Division, Glendive, Montana; August, 1895, to December, 1898, superintendent, Rocky Mountain Division, Missoula, Montana; December, 1898, to April, 1902, superintendent, Pacific Division, Tacoma, Washington; April, 1902, to September, 1903, assistant general superintendent; September, 1903, to May 1, 1904, acting chief engineer, and May 1, 1904, to December, 1905, chief engineer; December 1905, to date, chief engineer, Pacific Railway.
 Later president of the Milwaukee Road.

In 1916 he was president of the Texas Pacific Railroad when he was hired as a vice president of the New York, New Haven and Hartford Railroad.

He died on December 7, 1928 at Johns Hopkins Hospital in Baltimore, Maryland.

References

1863 births
1928 deaths
20th-century American railroad executives
Cornell University College of Engineering alumni
People from Rockville, Indiana